WCSF (88.7 FM) is a radio station based in Joliet, Illinois broadcasting an eclectic college radio music format for most of the year, switching to Christmas music from Thanksgiving through New Year's Day. The station is licensed to the University of St. Francis. The school was known as the College of St. Francis until 1998 and the broadcast license is still held in that name.

References

External links

CSF
CSF
Modern rock radio stations in the United States
Radio stations established in 1992
1992 establishments in Illinois